Ilija Bozoljac and Flavio Cipolla were the defending champions but chose not to defend their title.

Roman Jebavý and Jan Šátral won the title after defeating Andrea Arnaboldi and Maximilian Neuchrist 7–6(7–3), 4–6, [10–7] in the final.

Seeds

Draw

References

External links
 Main draw

Banja Luka Challenger - Doubles